Rogers Lake may refer to the following lakes in the United States:

Rogers Dry Lake, California
Rogers Lake (Minnesota)
Rogers Lake (Flathead County, Montana), in Glacier National Park
Lake Rogers Park, Odessa, Florida